Siyuichthyidae is an extinct family of stem-teleost fish known from the Early Cretaceous Tugulu Group of Xinjiang, China. It contains five genera with a total of nine species, all of which are based on poor remains.

Classification 
 Bogdaichthys 
 B. fukangensis
 B. serratus
 Dsungarichthys 
 D. bilineatus
 Manasichthys 
 M. elongatus
 M. tuguluensis
 Siyuichthys 
 S. ornatus
 S. pulchellus
 S. pulcher
 Wukangia 
 W. houyanshanensis

References 

Prehistoric ray-finned fish families
Early Cretaceous first appearances
Early Cretaceous extinctions